Johnston may refer to the surname Johnston or people with that name.  It may also refer to:

Places 
 Johnston Atoll, in the central Pacific Ocean
 Johnston, Pembrokeshire, Wales, United Kingdom
 Johnstown, Wrexham, Wales, United Kingdom
 Johnston railway station, serves the village of Johnston in Pembrokeshire, Wales
 Johnston, Northern Territory, Australia
 Canada
 Johnston Parish, New Brunswick
 United States
 Johnston, Iowa
 Johnston, Pennsylvania
 Johnston, Rhode Island
 Johnston, South Carolina
 Johnston County, North Carolina
 Johnston County, Oklahoma
 Port Johnston Coal Docks at Constable Hook
 Schools
 Johnston High School, Johnston, Iowa
 A.S. Johnston High School, Austin, Texas

Other uses 
 Johnston (typeface), the typeface used on the London Underground
 Johnston Press, a newspaper publishing company in the UK
 Johnston Model D1918 machine gun
 USS Johnston, two ships named in honor of United States Navy officer Johnston

See also
The Johnstons, Irish band
Johnston McCulley (1883–1958), American writer best known as the creator of Zorro
Johnstone
Johnstone (surname)
Johnson
Johnstown (disambiguation)